Steven B. Giddings is an American physicist.

Giddings earned a bachelor's degree from the University of Utah and a doctorate from Princeton University. He is a professor at the University of California, Santa Barbara. Giddings was elected a fellow of the American Physical Society in 2012, "[f]or his wide ranging contributions to gravitational physics at its intersection with elementary particle physics, especially his work on the quantum properties of black holes in the universe and in accelerators".

References

Princeton University alumni
21st-century American physicists
Year of birth missing (living people)
20th-century American physicists
Living people
Particle physicists
American astrophysicists
University of Utah alumni
University of California, Santa Barbara faculty
Fellows of the American Physical Society